Lighting Up the Stars is a 2022 Chinese drama film written and directed by Liu Jiangjiang and starring Zhu Yilong, Yang Enyou, Wang Ge, Liu Lu, and . The film follows the story of a mortician released from prison meets an orphan during a funeral, which unexpectedly changes his attitude towards career and life.  The film premiered in China on 24 June 2022. The total box office of the film is 1.712 billion yuan, ranking the 4th in China's 2022 box office list.

Cast
 Zhu Yilong as Mo Sanmei, a mortician.
 Yang Enyou as Wu Xiaowen, an orphan.
 Wang Ge as Wang Jianren, a mortician and assistant to Mo Sanmei.
 Liu Lu as Yin Baixue, a mortician who playing Suona.
  as Old Mo, Mo Sanmei's father.
  as Madam Mo, Mo Sanmei's elder sister.
 Janice Wu as Xi Xi, Mo Sanmei's ex-girlfriend.
  as Uncle Wu, Wu Xiaowen's uncle.
  as Wu Haifei, Wu Xiaowen's mother.
 Zhou Dan as Aunt, Wu Xiaowen's aunt.
 Wang Aizhi as Grandmother, Wu Xiaowen's maternal grandmother.

Soundtrack

Production
Liu Jiangjiang began to write the screenplay in 2019, which inspired by the funeral culture in north China.  read Liu Jiangjiang's drafts and gave notes for improvement.

Lighting Up the Stars began production on 27 May 2021 in Wuhan and finished filming on 1 August.

Release
Lighting Up the Stars was slated for release on 2 April 2022 (Qingming Festival) but was postponed to 24 June 2022.

Theatrical and Box Office

Streaming and viewership

Reception
Douban, a major Chinese media rating site, gave the drama 7.3 out of 10.

Accolades

References

External links
 
 

2022 films
Mandarin-language films
Chinese drama films
Films shot in Wuhan
Films set in Hubei
Films set in Sichuan